Hollywood...Basie's Way is an album by pianist and bandleader Count Basie and His Orchestra featuring performances of motion picture theme recorded in late 1966 and early 1967 and released on the Command label.

Track listing
 "Secret Love" (Sammy Fain, Paul Francis Webster) - 2:56
 "Laura" (David Raksin, Johnny Mercer) - 2:23
 "In the Still of the Night" (Cole Porter) - 1:56
 "A Foggy Day" (George Gershwin, Ira Gershwin) - 2:14
 "The Shadow of Your Smile" (Johnny Mandel, Webster) - 3:21
 "The Trolley Song" (Hugh Martin, Ralph Blane) - 2:16
 "Strangers in the Night" (Bert Kaempfert, Charles Singleton, Eddie Snyder) - 2:55
 "A Fine Romance" (Jerome Kern, Dorothy Fields) - 2:44
 "Carioca" (Vincent Youmans, Edward Eliscu, Gus Kahn) - 2:21
 "Hurry Sundown Blues" (Hugo Montenegro, Buddy Kaye) - 2:40
 "It Might as Well Be Spring" (Richard Rodgers, Oscar Hammerstein II) - 2:28
 "Days of Wine and Roses" (Henry Mancini, Mercer) - 2:38
Recorded on December 14, 1966 (tracks 1-3 & 12), December 21, 1966 (tracks 4, 6, 8 & 11) and January 16, 1967 (tracks 5, 7, 9 & 10)

Personnel 
Count Basie - piano
Al Aarons, Sonny Cohn, Gene Goe, Harry Edison  - trumpet
Richard Boone, Harlan Floyd, Grover Mitchell - trombone
Bill Hughes - bass trombone
Bobby Plater - alto saxophone, flute (tracks 5, 7, 9 & 10)
Jerry Dodgion (tracks 1-4, 6, 8, 11 & 12), Marshal Royal - alto saxophone
Eric Dixon - tenor saxophone, flute 
Eddie "Lockjaw" Davis - tenor saxophone
Charlie Fowlkes - baritone saxophone
Freddie Green - guitar
Norman Keenan  - bass
Ed Shaughnessy - drums
Chico O'Farrill - arranger

References 

1967 albums
Count Basie Orchestra albums
Albums produced by Teddy Reig
Albums arranged by Chico O'Farrill
Command Records albums